In mathematics, the star product is a method of combining graded posets with unique minimal and maximal elements, preserving the property that the posets are Eulerian.

Definition
We define the partial order  by  if and only if:

1.
2.

Example

 

Then  is the poset with the Hasse diagram below.

Properties
The star product of Eulerian posets is Eulerian.

See also
Product order, a different way of combining posets

References

 Stanley, R., Flag -vectors and the -index, Math. Z. 216 (1994), 483-499. 

Combinatorics